Romano Battisti (born 21 August 1986) is an Italian yachtsman and former rower, who won silver medal in double sculls at the 2012 Summer Olympics, with Alessio Sartori.

Biography
Paired with Francesco Fossi at the 2016 Rio Olympics, he came in fourth.

In 2019 Battisti faces another big bet, it is selected for the Luna Rossa team that will participate in the 2021 America's Cup in New Zealand.

Achievements

References

External links
 

Italian male rowers
Rowers at the 2012 Summer Olympics
Rowers at the 2016 Summer Olympics
Olympic rowers of Italy
Olympic silver medalists for Italy
1986 births
Living people
Olympic medalists in rowing
Medalists at the 2012 Summer Olympics
World Rowing Championships medalists for Italy
Sportspeople from the Province of Latina
Mediterranean Games gold medalists for Italy
Mediterranean Games bronze medalists for Italy
Mediterranean Games medalists in rowing
Competitors at the 2013 Mediterranean Games
Rowers of Fiamme Gialle
Italian male sailors (sport)
2021 America's Cup sailors